"Breathe" is a song by the Canadian rock band Nickelback. Written by Chad Kroeger, Ryan Peake and Mike Kroeger, it was the opening track on the band's second studio album, The State in 1998. With the album's reissue by Roadrunner Records, "Breathe" was released as the third single from on November 20, 2000, reaching number 16 on the Canadian Top Rock Songs chart, number 10 on the Billboard Mainstream Rock chart and number 2 on the US charts.

Background
"Breathe" was written by Nickelback's lead vocalist and guitarist Chad Kroeger, the guitarist and backing vocalist Ryan Peake and the bass guitarist Mike Kroeger. The song entered the RPM Canadian Top Rock Songs] chart at number 23 on August 7, 2000, and peaked at number 16 on October 2, 2000. The single later entered the US Billboard Hot Mainstream Rock Tracks chart at number 32 for the week of August 12, 2000. It remained in the top 40 for a total of 17 weeks, peaking at number 10 for the week of October 21, 2000. The song also reached number 21 on the Billboard Alternative Songs chart (then known as Hot Modern Rock Tracks) for the week of February 10, 2001, after 15 weeks on the chart since entering at number 38 on November 25, 2000. The song was included on MuchMusic's fifth Big Shiny Tunes compilation, Big Shiny Tunes 5, in November 2000, and on the soundtrack to the film Clockstoppers in March 2002.

Track listing

Personnel
Credits adapted from the liner notes of The State.
Chad Kroeger – lead vocals, guitar, production, talk-box
Ryan Peake – guitar, backing vocals, production
Mike Kroeger – bass guitar, production
Ryan Vikedal – drums, production
Dale Penner – production
Garth "GGGarth" Richardson – mixing
Three Mountain Design – design
Neil Zlozower – photography

Chart positions

References

External links

1998 songs
2000 singles
Nickelback songs
Songs written by Chad Kroeger
Songs written by Ryan Peake
Songs written by Mike Kroeger
Roadrunner Records singles